Yeni Əyricə (also, Ibragimbeyli, Ragimbeyli, and Yeniayridzha) is a village and municipality in the Barda Rayon of Azerbaijan.  It has a population of 1,572.

References

Populated places in Barda District